Constantin Cârstea (22 February 1949 – 16 November 2009) was a Romanian footballer who played as a defender. He was also a football coach. As a player he spent his entire professional career with Argeș Pitești.

International career
Constantin Cârstea made one appearance at international level for Romania, playing on 13 May 1979 under coach Florin Halagian in a 1–1 against Cyprus at the Euro 1980 qualifiers.

Honours

Player
Argeș Pitești
Divizia A: 1978–79

Manager
Gloria Bistrița
Romanian Cup: 1993–94

References

External links
 
 

1949 births
Romanian footballers
Association football defenders
Romania international footballers
Liga I players
FC Argeș Pitești players
Romanian football managers
FC Argeș Pitești managers
ACF Gloria Bistrița managers
CS Mioveni managers
FC Gloria Buzău managers
2009 deaths